In the economy of the Soviet Union and other communist states of the Soviet Bloc, the counterplan was a plan put forth by workers of an enterprise (or its structural unit) to exceed the expectations of the state plan allocated for the enterprise/unit. It was an important part of the socialist competition.

According to the Great Soviet Encyclopedia, the idea of the counterplan was put forth by the workers of the Karl Marx Plant, Leningrad, in June 1930, during the first five-year plan.

Since the 1960s, counterplans, in the form of obligations as part of Socialist emulation, to execute state plans (annual, quarterly, monthly) ahead of schedule were common in the Soviet Union and other communist states.

References

Economy of the Soviet Union
Soviet phraseology
Planning